Minnesota Department of Education (MDE) is a state agency of Minnesota. Its headquarters are in Minneapolis.

Commissioners
2023 – Present Willie Jett (appointed by Governor Tim Walz) 

2021 – 2023 Heather Mueller (appointed by Governor Tim Walz)
2019 - 2021 Mary Cathryn Ricker (appointed by Governor Tim Walz)
2010 - 2019 Brenda Cassellius (appointed by Governor Mark Dayton) 2004 - 2010 Alice Seagren (appointed by Governor Tim Pawlenty)
2003 - 2004 Cheri Yecke (appointed by Governor Tim Pawlenty)1999 - 2003 Christine Jax (appointed by Governor Jesse Ventura)

References

External links

 Minnesota Department of Education

State agencies of Minnesota
State departments of education of the United States
Public education in Minnesota